Dongxin Subdistrict is a subdistrict situated inside of Hedong District, Tianjin. it is located at the south of Lushan Street Subdistrict, west and north of Wanxin Subdistrict,, east of Xiangyanglou Subdistrict. Its population was 90,809 according to the 2020 Chinese Census.

The subdistrict's name literally means "Eastern New".

Administrative divisions 
As of the year 2021, Dongxin Subdistrict oversaw these following 15 communities:

References 

Township-level divisions of Tianjin
Hedong District, Tianjin